Stavro is both a given name and surname. Notable people with the name include:

 Stavro Jabra (1947–2017), Lebanese cartoonist and illustrator
 Stavro Skëndi (1905–1989), Albanian-American linguist and historian
 Astrid Stavro (born 1972), Italian graphic designer based in Barcelona
 Stavri Stavro (1885–1955), Albanian diplomat to Yugoslavia and Greece
 Steve Stavro (1926–2006), Macedonian-Canadian businessman and grocery store magnate

See also
 Stavros (disambiguation)
 Ernst Stavro Blofeld